Life Goes On is a 1932 British crime film directed by Jack Raymond and starring Elsie Randolph, Betty Stockfeld and Warwick Ward. It was made at British and Dominion's Elstree Studios as a supporting feature for release by Paramount Pictures.

Plot summary
A criminal hides the body of a dead financier in an effort to manipulate shares.

Cast
 Elsie Randolph as Phoebe Selsey
 Betty Stockfeld as Lady Sheridan
 Warwick Ward as Ronald St.John
 Jeanne Stuart as Clare Armore
 Dennis Hoey as Anthony Carlisle
 Anthony Holles as John Collis
 Wallace Geoffrey as Robert Kent
 Robert Horton as Sir George Sheridan
 Hugh Wakefield as Ridgeway Emsworth

See also 
 One New York Night (1935)

References

Bibliography
 Chibnall, Steve. Quota Quickies: The Birth of the British 'B' Film. British Film Institute, 2007.

External links
 
 

1932 films
1932 crime films
British crime films
1930s English-language films
Films directed by Jack Raymond
Quota quickies
Films set in England
British black-and-white films
Films set in hotels
British films based on plays
British and Dominions Studios films
Films shot at Imperial Studios, Elstree
1930s British films